Lynn Louis Heinzerling (October 23, 1906 – November 21, 1983) was an American correspondent for the Associated Press, who won the Pulitzer Prize for his coverage of the Congo crisis in 1961.

Biography
Lynn Heinzerling was born in Birmingham, Ohio, and raised in Elyria. After attending the University of Akron in 1924– 1925, he enrolled at Ohio Wesleyan University. Heinzerling graduated in 1927 and served as Cleveland's Plain-Dealer correspondent for five years from 1928. He covered such stories as the Ohio River flood, the Little steel strike, and the Torso Murders. Later, Heinzerling  entered the service of the Associated Press in Cleveland. He was traveling across Europe as an international correspondent from 1938 to 1945. On September 1, 1939, he was in Gdańsk, where he covered the early period of the German occupation. During the next years, he reported from Vienna, Helsinki, Copenhagen, Paris, Madrid, Lisbon, Rome, London, and Geneva, where he served as Associated Press editor-in-chief from 1948.

In 1957, Heinzerling  was named the head of the Johannesburg bureau. Four years later, he won the Pulitzer Prize for his coverage of the Congo crisis and other African developments. In 1963, he settled in Ohio to head the local bureau of the Associated Press. But in the last years of his career, Heinzerling returned to Africa as an international correspondent. After retiring in the United States in 1971, he moved to Elyria, where he died twelve years later. He was inducted posthumously into the Cleveland journalism hall of fame. Lynn was a father to Larry Heinzerling and Lynn Heinzerling Jr. He married Agnes Dengate.

References

Books

1906 births
1983 deaths
American military writers
Pulitzer Prize for International Reporting winners
People from Elyria, Ohio
Ohio Wesleyan University alumni
Associated Press people